Bang Na Nuea is a khwaeng (subdistrict) of Bang Na District, in Bangkok, Thailand. In a census of 2020, it had a total population of 40,897 people.

References

Subdistricts of Bangkok
Bang Na district